Sinks Valley is a  biological Site of Special Scientific Interest in Kesgrave, on the eastern outskirts of Ipswich in Suffolk, United Kingdom.

This site has diverse semi-natural habitats, with alder and oak woodland, a brook with fringing swamp, wet and dry grassland, spring fed fen and heath. Areas grazed by rabbits have a short turf rich in lichens, mosses and herbs. The nationally uncommon mossy stonecrop grows on paths.

The site is private property with no public access.

References

Sites of Special Scientific Interest in Suffolk